Live is the second live album by the band Blondie released in 1999 in the US and in 2000 in the UK.

As of August 9, 2005 it has sold 129,000 copies in United States.

Overview
The album was recorded during Blondie's successful 1998-99 comeback tour in support of their 1999 album, No Exit, and features all their best-known songs, including "Atomic", "The Tide Is High", "Call Me", and "Heart of Glass", as well as the 1999 UK #1 "Maria". The last track on the album is a manipulated live version of the song "One Way or Another" with the audience noise removed, which was used as a theme song for American dramedy TV series Snoops.

The UK edition of the album was renamed Livid and released on April 25, 2000. It featured the actual live version of "One Way or Another" instead of the Snoops theme version.

The album was also released on DVD twice, the first time in 1999 by Beyond Records and the second time in 2005 by EV Classics. The DVD edition captures the band filmed live on stage on February 23, 1999, at New York's Town Hall for their first hometown gig in 17 years, kicking off their 1999 US tour. The track listing of 2005 release is identical, but the running order is different.

Track listing

Track 17 is replaced with the actual live version on the UK edition with length 4:10

Personnel
Blondie
 Deborah Harry - vocals
 Chris Stein - guitar
 Jimmy Destri - keyboards
 Clem Burke - drums

Additional musicians
 Paul Carbonara - guitar
 Leigh Foxx - bass guitar

Production
CD
Tracks 1, 2, 7, 8, 10 and 12 recorded at Lyceum, London, November 22, 1998 by The BBC Live Music Mobile.
Tracks 3, 4, 9, 13, 14 and 17 recorded at House Of Blues, Las Vegas, March 10, 1999. Mobile recording by Westwood One.
Track 5 recorded at Town Hall, New York City, February 23, 1999. Recorded by All Mobile Video Truck.
Track 6 recorded at 1999 Glastonbury Festival, June 25, 1999. Recorded by The BBC Live Music Mobile.
Tracks 11, 15 and 16 recorded at Riviera Theater, Chicago, August 14, 1999. Recorded by Metro Music Recording, Glenview, IL.

References

Blondie (band) albums
Live video albums
1999 live albums
1999 video albums